Six-Five Special is a British television programme launched in February 1957 when both television and rock and roll were in their infancy in Britain.

Description
Six-Five Special was the BBC's first attempt at a rock-and-roll programme. Its title was derived from its broadcast time, as it aired at 6:05 on Saturday evening. It began immediately after the abolition of the Toddlers' Truce, in which programming ceased between 6 p.m. and 7 p.m. so that children could be put to bed.

Jack Good was the show's original producer, and Josephine Douglas and (initially) disc jockey Pete Murray were its presenters, with Murray using the catchphrase "Time to jive on the old six five." Its resident band was Don Lang and His Frantic Five. The show opened with film of a steam train accompanied by the programme's theme song, played and sung by the Bob Cort Skiffle Group, which began with the words "The Six-Five Special's comin' down the line, The Six-Five Special's right on time ..."

BBC executives originally preferred a magazine format, but Good wanted a show with music and much movement. The original sets were removed and the empty studio space filled with the milling audience and performers. Television at that time was completely live as recording technology was limited, so once the programme started, it ran in an impromptu fashion. The running order was sketched out on Friday morning, and then only one complete run-through happened immediately before transmission on Saturday evening.

The show was originally scheduled to last just six weeks but, as a result of its popularity, the series became open-ended. The BBC interfered with Good's vision of the show by including educational and information elements, which Good wanted to drop, as they diluted the music. The relationship between Good and the BBC became strained, and he resigned in early 1958.

Good joined the ITV company ABC to create Oh Boy!, which featured non-stop music and lost the public-service-inspired elements as part of its more frenzied pace, trouncing Six-Five Special in the ratings. The BBC, never keen on the Six-Five Special, took this as vindication and pulled the show. It was to be half a decade before Top of the Pops restored BBC coverage of contemporary popular music in general and pop in particular

Stage Show 
In January and February 1958 Jack Good produced The Six-Five Stage Show, a spin-off live show which toured the UK, promoted by Harold Fielding. Presented by Josephine Douglas, Pete Murray and ex-boxer Freddie Mills the show featured performances by The John Barry Seven, Cab Kaye, The Five Dallas Boys, The Vernons Girls, Adam Faith and Kerry Martin, joined by a different "local skiffle group" in each venue. The script was by Trevor Peacock.

Artists
Among the artists on the show were Petula Clark, Jim Dale, Johnny Dankworth, Terry Dene, Lonnie Donegan, Russ Hamilton, Cleo Laine, Joan Regan, Finlay Currie, boxer Freddie Mills, Wee Willie Harris, Jimmy Lloyd, Marty Wilde, the Dallas Boys and Tommy Steele.

Comedy performers included Trevor Peacock, who was also a script writer for the show, Spike Milligan and Bernie Winters.

Film
A spin-off film was released in 1958, scripted by Norman Hudis and directed by Alfred Shaughnessy. It centred around a young woman's quest for stardom, played by up-and-coming musical star Diane Todd. It featured performances from Lonnie Donegan, Dickie Valentine, Jim Dale, Petula Clark, Russ Hamilton and Joan Regan, among others, and featured comic relief from Mike and Bernie Winters.

See also 
American Bandstand, U.S. show from same era
Juke Box Jury
Ready Steady Go!
The Tube
Later with Jools Holland

References

External links
 Six Five Special Dedicated website
 Six Five Special at Whirligig TV.
  (TV series)
  (1958 Film)
 Six-Five Special (1957–58) British Film Institute history
 Six-Five Special MSN Movies entry
 Billy Fury.com  has a section on Jack Good and the making of the Six Five Special. Retrieved October 2008
 "Six-Five Special" Clips at YouTube
 Britain in a Box: 5 March 2008 (BBC Radio 4 programme)

BBC Television shows
Pop music television series
Rock music television series
1957 British television series debuts
1958 British television series endings
1950s British music television series